The 3rd Minnesota Infantry Regiment was a Minnesota USV infantry regiment that served in the Union army during the American Civil War. It fought in several campaigns in the Western Theater.

Service

The 3rd Minnesota Infantry Regiment was mustered in by companies at Fort Snelling, Minnesota, between October 2 and November 14, 1861, and was sent to Kentucky on November 14, 1861. It remained on garrison duty in Kentucky and Tennessee until most of the men were captured by Nathan Bedford Forrest at Murfreesboro, Tennessee, on July 13, 1862. They were subsequently paroled and sent to Benton Barracks at St. Louis, Missouri, to await parole. Their commanding officer, Colonel Lester, and the other officers who voted for surrender were held accountable for the debacle at Murfreesboro and were dismissed from the service in December 1862. Further description of the surrender at Murfreesboro can be found in the papers of William D. Hale, a member of the 3rd Minnesota.

The regiment was formally exchanged on August 27, 1862, and moved home to Minnesota arriving at Fort Snelling on 4 September.   On 12 September the Regiment joined Col H. H. Sibley at Fort Ridgely where it joined in the suppression of the Dakota War of 1862.  In September the 3rd Minnesota participated in the defeat of the Sioux at the Battle of Wood Lake on September 23. At the end of the brief campaign, the regiment returned to Fort Snelling to board riverboats south.  They were posted to garrison duty in Kentucky and Tennessee in January 1863.  The Regiment remained there until joining in the Siege of Vicksburg until the surrender of the defenders on July 4, 1863. The regiment then participated in the campaign to capture Little Rock, Arkansas, from August 13 to September 10, 1863, and remained in garrison there after the fall of the city until April 28, 1864.

Enough of the soldiers of the regiment reenlisted in January 1864 to Veteranize it.  Part of the 3rd Minnesota participated in an expedition up the White River to Augusta, Arkansas, from March 30 to April 3, 1864, culminating in the  Battle of Fitzhugh's Woods on April 1, 1864. The regiment remained in various garrisons to the end of the war.

The 3rd Minnesota Infantry was discharged from service at Fort Snelling on September 16, 1865.

Casualties

The 3rd Minnesota Infantry suffered 17 enlisted men killed in action or who later died of their wounds, plus another 4 officers and 275 enlisted men who died of disease, for a total of 296 fatalities.

Colonels
Colonel Henry C. Lester – November 15, 1861, to December 1, 1862.
Colonel Chauncey Wright Griggs – December 1, 1862, to July 15, 1863.
Colonel Christopher C. Andrews – July 15, 1863, to June 13, 1864.
Colonel Hans Mattson – June 13, 1864, to September 2, 1865.

See also
List of Minnesota Civil War Units

References
 
Carley, Kenneth. Minnesota in the Civil War. St. Paul: Minnesota Historical Society Press, 2000. .
Joseph C. Fitzharris, "'The Hardest Lot of Men…': The Third Minnesota Infantry in the Civil War". Norman, OK: University of Oklahoma Press, 2019.

Notes

External links
 The Civil War Archive
 MNopedia article on the Third Minnesota
 Minnesota Historical Society site on Minnesota and the Civil War

Units and formations of the Union Army from Minnesota
1861 establishments in Minnesota
Military units and formations established in 1861
Military units and formations disestablished in 1865